This article presents a timeline of events in the history of 16-bit x86 DOS-family disk operating systems from 1980 to present.  Non-x86 operating systems named "DOS" are not part of the scope of this timeline.

Also presented is a timeline of events in the history of the 8-bit 8080-based and 16-bit x86-based CP/M operating systems from 1974 to 2014, as well as the hardware and software developments from 1973 to 1995 which formed the foundation for the initial version and subsequent enhanced versions of these operating systems.

DOS releases have been in the forms of:
 OEM adaptation kits (OAKs) – all Microsoft releases before version 3.2 were OAKs only
 Shrink wrap packaged product for smaller OEMs (system builders) – starting with MS-DOS 3.2 in 1986,Microsoft offered these in addition to OAKs
 End-user retail – all versions of IBM PC DOS (and other OEM-adapted versions) were sold to end users.DR-DOS began selling to end users with version 5.0 in July 1990, followed by MS-DOS 5.0 in June 1991
 Free download – starting with OpenDOS 7.01 in 1997, followed by FreeDOS alpha 0.05 in 1998(FreeDOS project was announced in 1994)

DOS era version overview (1980–1995)

1973–1980: Hardware foundations and CP/M

1980–1995: Important events in DOS history

1995–2000: Windows 9x era

2001–2022: Post-millennium

See also
Comparison of DOS operating systems
List of DOS commands
Timeline of Intel
Timeline of Microsoft
Timeline of Microsoft Windows
Timeline of operating systems
Comparison of operating systems
List of operating systems

Notes

References

External links
 Origins of DOS , Tim Paterson website
 PC DOS Retro by Vernon C. Brooks
 I.B.M. Executive Describes Price Pressure by Microsoft, New York Times, May 28, 1999
 IBM vs. Microsoft Google Ngram Viewer
 DR-DOS versions 

DOS
 Timeline of x86 DOS